Pretty Girls Make Raves is an album by electronic music artist Kid 606. It was released on Tigerbeat6. The album title is a parody of both a song by The Smiths and the band named after it.

Track listing
 "Let It Rock" (Miguel Depedro) – 4:52
 "Chicken Fight" (Depedro) – 8:33
 "Boomin'" (Depedro) – 5:49
 "Meet Me at the Bottom" (Depedro) – 4:40
 "Comeuppance" (Depedro) – 5:23
 "T.Y.T.R." (Depedro) – 4:09
 "Get Down Low" (Depedro) – 5:13
 "Oakland Highsiding" (Depedro) – 4:41

References

External links
 [ Pretty Girls Make Raves] at Allmusic

2006 albums
Acid techno albums
Kid606 albums
Tigerbeat6 albums